Pseudopostega contigua is a moth of the family Opostegidae. It was described by Donald R. Davis and Jonas R. Stonis, 2007. It is known from riparian forest along the Rio Negro of southern Venezuela.

The length of the forewings is about 2 mm. Adults have been recorded in December.

Etymology
The species name is derived from the Latin contiguus (meaning near, adjacent) in reference to the paired, contiguous, apical lobes of the male gnathos.

References

Opostegidae
Moths described in 2007